The West Butte Schoolhouse, in Sutter County, California near Live Oak, was listed on the National Register of Historic Places in 2016.

It is a one-room schoolhouse built in 1909, to replace an 1860 schoolhouse destroyed by a fire in 1908.

It was used as a residence after 1943.

It is located at 14226 Pass Rd. near Live Oak.

The listing included two contributing structures: a well house with compatible architecture, and a board & batten storage shed.

References

External links

One-room schoolhouses in California
School buildings on the National Register of Historic Places in California
Schools in California		
National Register of Historic Places in Sutter County, California
American Craftsman architecture in California
School buildings completed in 1909
1909 establishments in California